Rhythm Heritage was a 1970s American disco-funk band, best known for their 1976 US number one single "Theme from S.W.A.T.". It sold over one million copies and was awarded a gold disc by the Recording Industry Association of America (RIAA) in February 1976. They also recorded theme music for several other ABC television shows, including "Keep Your Eye on the Sparrow," also from 1976, from Baretta (sung by Sammy Davis Jr.).

Rhythm Heritage was formed in 1975 by producer Steve Barri and session keyboardist Michael Omartian, and included bassist Scott Edwards and drummer Ed Greene. Other musicians who played on some of their recordings included Ben Benay, Victor Feldman, Jay Graydon, James Jamerson, Ray Parker Jr., Dean Parks, and Bob Walden.

Discography

Albums
 1976 - Disco-fied
 1977 - Last Night on Earth - AUS number 97
 1978 - Sky's the Limit
 1979 - Disco Derby

Singles
 1975 - "Theme from S.W.A.T." (US #1, Canada #1)
 1976 - "Baretta's Theme (Keep Your Eye on the Sparrow)" (US #20, Canada #15)
 1977 - "Theme from Rocky (Gonna Fly Now)" (US #94, Canada #92)

See also
List of artists who reached number one in the United States

References

External links
 A fan-maintained Rhythm Heritage website

American funk musical groups
American disco groups
ABC Records artists